Airlift International was an American airline that operated from 1945 to 1991. Airlift's headquarters were on the grounds of Miami International Airport in unincorporated Miami-Dade County, Florida.

History 

Airlift International was founded as Riddle Airlines by John Paul Riddle in 1945 in Miami, Florida as a charter and freight airline. In 1965, Riddle Airlines was renamed to Airlift International. In 1968, Airlift expanded and acquired Slick Airways.

The first flights were between Miami and Puerto Rico using Curtiss C-46 and Douglas DC-4 aircraft. In 1951 it expanded services to serve New York City. Then the route system was expanded to include Chicago and Detroit. In 1960 two Douglas DC-7 were added to the fleet and with those aircraft were used for charter flights to Europe, including charters for the military.

The next aircraft type to join the fleet was the Armstrong Whitworth AW.660 Argosy dedicated cargo aircraft, but those were replaced in 1963 by the Douglas DC-8. Further aircraft used were the L-1049 Super Constellation, the Canadair CL-44, the Lockheed L-382 Hercules, the Boeing 707, and the  Boeing 727-100QC.

The freight schedule was augmented by charter flights to South America and the military but by 1981 Airlift International went into Chapter 11 bankruptcy for reorganization. Following the reorganization the DC-8-54, the Fairchild FH-227 and F-27 models were used.

Due to financial problems during 1990 and 1991, Airlift International ceased operations in June 1991.

Fleet 

 Boeing 707-300C
 Boeing 727-100QC
 Curtiss C-46 Commando
 Douglas DC-6A
 Douglas DC-7-CF
 Douglas DC-8-51F
 Douglas DC-8-54F
 Douglas DC-8-61
 Douglas DC-8-63F
 Douglas DC-8-73F
 Fairchild F27
 Fairchild FH-227C

See also
 List of defunct airlines of the United States

References 

Defunct airlines of the United States
Companies based in Miami-Dade County, Florida
Airlines established in 1945
Airlines disestablished in 1991
Defunct companies based in Florida
Companies that filed for Chapter 11 bankruptcy in 1981
American companies established in 1945
Airlines based in Florida